Go Soeda was the defending champion, but chose not to compete this year.
Tobias Kamke won the title, defeating Ryan Harrison 6–1, 6–1 in the final.

Seeds

Draw

Finals

Top half

Bottom half

References
 Main draw
 Qualifying draw

2010 ATP Challenger Tour
2010 Singles